Tai Nguyen (born 25 February 1975) is a Vietnamese-Australian actor. Nguyen began his acting career and best known for his role as Jack Tran Nguyen on the 1994 Australian teen drama series Heartbreak High.

Early life 
Nguyen was born in Saigon. Vietnam. His family escaped Vietnam by boat in 1980. After spending time in a Malaysian refugee camp, the family was sponsored by a Dutch Reform Church to settle in Tasmania, Australia where he spent his early childhood. Nguyen has appeared as himself in a documentary by the ABC about the plight of refugees.

Career 
Nguyen primarily works in television, having appeared in several productions over the past two decades. His first major acting role was in 1994 in a television show called Heartbreak High alongside Alex Dimitriades, Tony Martin and Sarah Lambert which gained significant press in Australia at the time for its groundbreaking gritty portrayal of multiculturalism in Australian schools. His second role in 1996 was a swimming athlete training for the olympics in a television show called Sweat alongside Heath Ledger and Martin Henderson.

Nguyen's television work includes Heartbreak High, Sweat and Wild Side.

In 2017 he will appear in Blue Murder: Killer Cop  alongside Richard Roxburgh in a two-part Australian television miniseries based on true events, produced by Seven Network.

Filmography

References

External links 
 

1975 births
20th-century Australian male actors
20th-century Vietnamese male actors
21st-century Australian male actors
21st-century Vietnamese male actors
Australian male film actors
Australian male stage actors
Australian male television actors
Australian people of Vietnamese descent
Living people
Male actors from Tasmania
People from Ho Chi Minh City
People from Tasmania
Vietnamese emigrants to Australia
Vietnamese male film actors
Vietnamese male television actors